Bovim is a surname. Notable people with the surname include:

Frode Bovim (born 1977), Norwegian sailor
Gunnar Bovim (born 1960), Norwegian physician and civil servant
Ingvill Måkestad Bovim (born 1981), Norwegian track and field athlete

Norwegian-language surnames